William de Bergeveney DD (or Bergevenny) was an English medieval judge and university chancellor.

Between 1341 and 1345, William de Bergeveney was Chancellor of the University of Oxford. He was a Doctor of Divinity.

William de Bergeveney was named in a Papal Bull as being involved as a judge in a case of the Prior and brethren of St Augustine the Eremite involving the Diocese of Norwich.

References

Year of birth unknown
Year of death unknown
Chancellors of the University of Oxford
14th-century English judges
14th-century Roman Catholics